Dinky Dog is a Saturday-morning animated series produced by the Australian division of Hanna-Barbera, which aired on CBS from September 9, 1978, to September 5, 1981. It was Hanna-Barbera's first show created and produced in Australia.

Dinky Dog was originally broadcast as an 11-minute segment on The All New Popeye Hour. When The All New Popeye Hour was shortened to a half-hour and retitled The Popeye and Olive Comedy Show in September 1981, Dinky Dog was spun off into a show of its own, packing two 11-minute instalments per half-hour episode.

Summary
The show is about two girls, ditzy and beautiful blonde haired Sandy (voiced by Jackie Joseph) and smart, sensible, bespectacled brunette Monica (voiced by Julie Bennett), living with their Uncle Dudley (voiced by Frank Nelson). Sandy bought a cute puppy named Dinky (voiced by Frank Welker), which suddenly grew to the size of a polar bear. Sandy is now stuck dragging Monica into always finding work and different ways to repair the damages Dinky causes at their poor uncle's expense. Sure enough, however, Dinky always seems to fix things in an unexpected way and is forgiven, much to Uncle Dudley's dislike.

In the second portion of the series, Dudley takes the nieces for a world tour on a rented leisure boat, giving Dinky a chance to cause mishap on the different continents for more adventures.

Episodes

Voice cast

Main cast
Dinky - Frank Welker
Uncle Dudley - Frank Nelson
Monica - Julie Bennett
Sandy - Jackie Joseph

Additional voices
 Roger Behr
 Ted Cassidy
 Ross Martin
 Don Messick
 Pat Parris
 William Schallert
 Hal Smith
 John Stephenson

Home media
Visual Entertainment released Dinky Dog: The Complete Series on DVD in Region 1 (Canada only) on February 19, 2008.  On October 14, 2011, VEI (distributed by Millennium Entertainment) released the complete series on DVD in the US.

References

External links

Dinky Dog at the Big Cartoon DataBase
Dinky Dog @ Toonarific Cartoons

1978 Australian television series debuts
1981 Australian television series endings
1970s Australian animated television series
1978 American television series debuts
1981 American television series endings
1970s American animated television series
1980s American animated television series
CBS original programming
American animated television spin-offs
American children's animated comedy television series
Australian television spin-offs
Australian children's animated comedy television series
Animated television series about dogs
Hanna-Barbera characters
Television series by Endemol Australia
Television series by Hanna-Barbera